The 2015 NHK Trophy was the final event of six in the 2015–16 ISU Grand Prix of Figure Skating, a senior-level international invitational competition series. It was held at the Big Hat in Nagano on November 27–29. Medals were awarded in the disciplines of men's singles, ladies' singles, pair skating, and ice dancing. Skaters earned points toward qualifying for the 2015–16 Grand Prix Final.

Entries

Changes to preliminary assignments
 On September 9, Kana Muramoto / Chris Reed, Mariko Kihara and Keiji Tanaka were added as host picks.
 On September 24, Joshua Farris was removed from the roster. U.S. Figure Skating announced he had to withdraw due to a concussion. On September 28, his replacement was announced as Grant Hochstein.
 On November 11, Gabriella Papadakis / Guillaume Cizeron withdrew due to Papadakis not having fully recovered from her concussion. On November 17, Penny Coomes / Nicholas Buckland were announced as their replacement.
 On November 20, Tatiana Volosozhar / Maxim Trankov withdrew due to an injury to Volosozhar. They were replaced by Amani Fancy / Christopher Boyadji. Ice dancers Alexandra Paul / Mitchell Islam also withdrew. On November 21, they were replaced by Anastasia Cannuscio / Colin McManus.
 On November 21, Jason Brown withdrew due to a back strain injury. On November 23, he was replaced by Brendan Kerry.
 On November 23, Maé-Bérénice Méité withdrew from the ladies' event.

Results

Men
Yuzuru Hanyu set a new world record for the short program (106.33), for the free skating (216.07), and for the combined total (322.40). He became the first person to have broken 200-point in the free skating and 300-point in the combined total as well as 100-point in the short program (2014 Winter Olympics).

Ladies

Pairs

Ice dancing

References

External links
 2015 NHK Trophy at the International Skating Union
 Starting orders and result details

NHK Trophy, 2015
NHK Trophy